Karl Sune Zetterberg (12 December 1907 – 9 June 1962) was a Swedish footballer who played for Brage. He was capped four times for the Sweden national football team in 1931, scoring six goals.

Career statistics

International

International goals
Scores and results list Sweden's goal tally first.

References

1907 births
1962 deaths
Swedish footballers
Sweden international footballers
Association football forwards
IK Brage players
People from Borlänge Municipality
Sportspeople from Dalarna County